Spencer Averick is an American film editor and producer. Best known for his work as an editor on critically acclaimed films Middle of Nowhere (2012), Selma (2014) and for producing 2016 acclaimed documentary 13th for which he received Academy Award for Best Documentary Feature nominations at 89th Academy Awards, that he shared with director Ava DuVernay and co-producer Howard Barish. His wife is The Simpsons writer and producer Elisabeth Kiernan Averick.

Awards and nominations

References

External links
 

Living people
American editors
American producers
American directors
Year of birth missing (living people)